An Ideal is the third studio album by Chinese singer-songwriter Ronghao Li, released on January 22, 2016, by Warner Music Taiwan. The album contains 11 songs, with the album's total length being 53:04 minutes.

Information 
The following is the official comment on An Ideal's release: "Staying ordinary in an extraordinary world, with his (Ronghao Li) music, slowly disintegrating the veil of lies we've been wearing. They call it an ideal, something extraordinary, but at the same time ordinary. Even though stumbled over rocks and lost our ways in the mist, it doesn't mean it's over. Living in the day, living in the night, venturing through this metropolis, we all see things with our own way. But why not observe our world with Ronghao Li's perspective. See things in a new way. See loneliness in a new way. See sadness in a new way. In a brighter way. And sing our ideals."

Track listing

Critical reception 
An Ideal has average to positive reviews on Douban, which is the Chinese equivalent of IMDB, 6.6 out of 10, with 1669 critics and listeners, with most of them (33.5%) giving the album 3/5 stars. Most of the audience gave the album 1 to 3 stars whilst the critics gave the album 3-5 stars out of 5. Most of the critics commented on Ronghao Li's slight change of style, commenting "kind of disappointing", "lyrics sounds great, music sounds rushed", etc. Most of the audience thought that this album is "bland and boring". However, some critics praised Ronghao Li's change of style, and some thought that the album's quality is still very high. Most audiences and critics, however, came to a consensus that the overall quality has, in fact, fallen, compared to the previous albums.

Awards 
On 2016, April 15, Ronghao Li won the "Chinese Album of the Year" for his album "An Ideal".

References

Mandopop albums
2016 albums